Smedsböle Radio Mast is a mast in Smedsböle, Finland. It has a height of 244 metres (801 feet). It is the tallest building in Åland.

See also
List of tallest structures in Finland

Notes

Radio masts and towers in Europe
Communication towers in Finland
Transmitter sites in Finland
Buildings and structures in Åland